Refo Çapari (1884–1944) was an Albanian politician and religious leader. Çapari was the first prefect of the Vlorë County and the first biographer of Ismail Qemali. He is considered to be the introducer of the Baháʼí Faith in Albania.

Life 
A member of the Çapari family he was born in modern northwestern Greece (Çamëria). In the late 1900s he graduated from the law school of Istanbul. After the Albanian Declaration of Independence Çapari became the first prefect of the Vlorë County. During World War I Refo Çapari migrated to the USA, where he converted to the Baháʼí Faith in 1928.

In 1931 Capari returned to Korçë, Albania. In a letter dated 8 June 1931 he informed Shoghi Effendi of his arrival in Tirana on 28 April 1931. In the same letter he mentions that there was no Albanian Bahá’í literature available, that he had started working at the Ministry of Education and that he would start translating Bahá’í books immediately. Capari is responsible for The Hidden Words, the first known published translation of Bahá’í literature into Albanian.

In a letter to the Guardian dated 19 August 1933, Refo Çapari announced the publication in Albanian of J.E. Esslemont's book “Bahá’u’lláh and the New Era”. Dr. Howard Carpenter visited Refo Çapari in Tirana in 1932.

In May 1933, Martha Root visited Albania for the second time. On that occasion, Root met Refo Çapari, who was now married to Fiqrije Çapari, mother of two daughters from a previous marriage, namely Myrvet and Muveddat.

In 1938 he started publishing in Korçë and Tiranë the Baháʼí journal The supreme plume.

Refo Çapari died in Korçë in 1944.

Sources 

Albanian politicians
1884 births
1944 deaths
Cham Albanians
Albanian Bahá'ís
Converts to the Bahá'í Faith
19th-century Bahá'ís
20th-century Bahá'ís
Albanian translators
Translators to Albanian
Istanbul University Faculty of Law alumni
20th-century translators